The 29th Annual Australian Recording Industry Association Music Awards (generally known as ARIA Music Awards or simply The ARIAs) are a series of award ceremonies which include the 2015 ARIA Artisan Awards, ARIA Hall of Fame Awards, ARIA Fine Arts Awards and the ARIA Awards. The latter ceremony took place on 26 November at the Star Event Centre and aired on Network Ten.

The final nominees for ARIA Award categories were announced on 7 October as well as nominees and winners for Fine Arts Awards and Artisan Awards. ARIA opened the public-voted categories Song of the Year, Best International Act, Best Australian Live Act and Best Video, which includes Twitter live vote for Best Australian Live Act. Tame Impala won the most awards with five trophies from six nominations, while Courtney Barnett received the most final nominations with eight categories and won four. Tina Arena was inducted into the ARIA Hall of Fame at the ceremony.

Performers

The following artists performed at the ARIA Music Awards:
Conrad Sewell
 Flight Facilities
 Hermitude
Jarryd James
Jessica Mauboy
 Nathaniel
 Peking Duk
 The Veronicas
 Vance Joy
 Tina Arena
 Ed Sheeran

Presenters

The following presenters handed out trophies at the ceremony:

 Ed Sheeran presented Song Of The Year
 Joel Creasey presented Best Children's Album and Best Comedy Release
 Guy Sebastian presented Best Pop Release 
 Sheppard presented Best Group
 Catherine Britt presented Best Adult Contemporary Album 
 Adam Brand and Jasmine Rae presented Best Country Album 
 Iva Davies presented Album Of The Year
 Veronica & Lewis presented Best Hard Rock/Heavy Metal Album
 Ian Moss presented Best Rock Album
 Rove McManus presented Best Female Artist
 Scott Tweedie and Olivia Phyland presented Best Australian Live Act
 Kylie Minogue inducts Tina Arena into the ARIA Hall Of Fame

ARIA Hall of Fame inductee

On 25 October ARIA announced that Tina Arena was due to be inducted into their Hall of Fame. To further honour her, and previous inductees, the ARIA Hall of Fame Walk was established on 6 November with Arena as the first artist to be featured. At the ceremony she was introduced by Kylie Minogue, also a Hall of Fame inductee, and was presented the trophy by cyclist, Cadel Evans. Arena performed a new version of her 1994 song, "Chains", which featured Jessica Mauboy and the Veronicas on co-lead vocals. Arena released the performance as a single, which debuted at No. 14 on the ARIA Singles Chart.

In her acceptance speech Arena wanted to "acknowledge that ladies over 40 are still in the game" she specifically named Minogue, Madonna, Jennifer Lopez and Annie Lennox; she continued "Keep doing what you're doing, ladies, because we will decide when it's time for us to stop." She also voiced her concern about support for local artists by broadcasters, "Radio please don't try and meet your Australian quotas because you have to, exceed them because you really want to".
 Tina Arena

Multiple winners and nominees

 Tame Impala – 5 wins from 6 nominations
 Courtney Barnett – 4 wins from 8 nominations
 Vance Joy – 1 win from 7 nominations
 Jarryd James – 1 win from 5 nominations
 Hermitude – 7 nominations
 Gang of Youths – 5 nominations

Nominees and winners

ARIA Awards

Winners are listed first and highlighted in boldface; other final nominees are listed alphabetically by artists' first name.

Fine Arts Awards

Winners are listed first and highlighted in boldface; other final nominees are listed alphabetically by artists' first name. Winners were announced on 7 October.

Artisan Awards

Winners are listed first and highlighted in boldface; other final nominees are listed alphabetically by artists' first name. Winners were announced on 7 October.

See also
Music of Australia

Notes

References

External links

2015 in Australian music
2015 music awards
ARIA Music Awards